is a railway station in the city of Handa, Aichi Prefecture,  Japan, operated by Meitetsu.

Lines

Station layout
The station has two opposed side platforms connected by a level crossing. The station is unattended.

Platforms

Adjacent stations

Station history
Narawa Station was opened on April 1, 1931 as a station on the Chita Railway. The Chita Railway became part of the Meitetsu group on February 2, 1943. In February 2007, the Tranpass system of magnetic fare cards with automatic turnstiles was implemented, and the station has been unattended since that time.

Passenger statistics
In fiscal 2018, the station was used by an average of 1105 passengers daily (boarding passengers only).

Surrounding area
Narawa Junior High School
Narawa Elementary School

See also
 List of Railway Stations in Japan

References

External links

 Official web page

Railway stations in Japan opened in 1931
Railway stations in Aichi Prefecture
Stations of Nagoya Railroad
Handa, Aichi